John M. Rowan (born May 17, 1829 in Craig County, Virginia), he was about sixteen years old he came to Gap Mills, West Virginia to work as a clerk for Andrew Summers. He worked there for several years until the California Gold Rush in 1849. After receiving word about this new opportunity he joined in partnership with several other man and purchased a ship at Richmond, Virginia. The ship was provisioned for two years and then set on its journey around Cape Horn and to California. It was here that John had a fair amount of success with his gold hunting. After his successful time in California he returned to Gap Mills where he married Virginia Summers in 1855. On April 23, 1857, Virginia gave birth to a son, Andrew Summers Rowan, who was named for her father. In 1860 and 1862 he was elected to the Virginia House of Delegates. He became a Democratic member of the West Virginia House of Delegates, serving as Speaker of the House from 1887-1889. In 1891 he was appointed to the newly created state board of agriculture and from 1892-1896 served as West Virginia State Treasurer. In 1904, he was a delegate to the Democratic National Convention.

Sources 
Morton, Oren F. (1980) History of Monroe County West Virginia; Regional Publishing Company pgs. 397-398

References

1829 births
Members of the Virginia House of Delegates
Year of death missing
Speakers of the West Virginia House of Delegates
Democratic Party members of the West Virginia House of Delegates
People from Craig County, Virginia
People from Monroe County, West Virginia
19th-century American politicians